The  is the 16th edition of the Japan Film Professional Awards. It awarded the best of 2006 in film. The ceremony did not take place in this year.

Awards 
Best Film: Yokohama Mary
Best Director: Miwa Nishikawa (Sway)
Best Actress: Miki Nakatani (Memories of Matsuko, Loft)
Best Actor: Etsushi Toyokawa (Yawarakai Seikatsu, Loft, Hula Girls)
Best New Director: Takayuki Nakamura (Yokohama Mary)
Special: Ryūichi Hiroki (Yawarakai Seikatsu, Koi Suru Nichiyōbi)
Special: Akio Jissoji (For Silver Kamen and his longtime work.)
Popularity: Kaori Momoi (For strenuous efforts for her directorial debut film.)

10 best films
 Yokohama Mary (Takayuki Nakamura)
 Sway (Miwa Nishikawa)
 Yawarakai Seikatsu (Ryūichi Hiroki)
 Kamome Shokudo (Naoko Ogigami)
 Strawberry Shortcakes (Hitoshi Yazaki)
 Memories of Matsuko (Tetsuya Nakashima)
 Kamyu Nante Shiranai (Mitsuo Yanagimachi)
 Loft (Kiyoshi Kurosawa)
 Noriko's Dinner Table (Sion Sono)
 Mamiya kyodai (Yoshimitsu Morita)

References

External links
  

Japan Film Professional Awards
2007 in Japanese cinema
Japan Film Professional Awards